The term "bootstrap model" is used for a class of theories that use very general consistency criteria to determine the form of a quantum theory from some assumptions on the spectrum of particles. It is a form of S-matrix theory.

Overview
In the 1960s and '70s, the ever-growing list of strongly interacting particles — mesons and baryons — made it clear to physicists that none of these particles is elementary. Geoffrey Chew and others went so far as to question the distinction between composite and elementary particles, advocating a "nuclear democracy" in which the idea that some particles were more elementary than others was discarded. Instead, they sought to derive as much information as possible about the strong interaction from plausible assumptions about the S-matrix, which describes what happens when particles of any sort collide, an approach advocated by Werner Heisenberg two decades earlier.

The reason the program had any hope of success was because of crossing, the principle that the forces between particles are determined by particle exchange. Once the spectrum of particles is known, the force law is known, and this means that the spectrum is constrained to bound states which form through the action of these forces. The simplest way to solve the consistency condition is to postulate a few elementary particles of spin less than or equal to one, and construct the scattering perturbatively through field theory, but this method does not allow for composite particles of spin greater  than 1 and without the then undiscovered phenomenon of confinement, it is naively inconsistent with the observed Regge behavior of hadrons.

Chew and followers believed that it would be possible to use crossing symmetry and Regge behavior to formulate a consistent S-matrix for infinitely many particle types. The Regge hypothesis would determine the spectrum, crossing  and analyticity would determine the scattering amplitude (the forces), while unitarity would determine the self-consistent quantum corrections in a way analogous to including loops. The only fully successful implementation of the program required another assumption to organize the mathematics of unitarity (the narrow resonance approximation). This meant that all the hadrons were stable particles in the first approximation, so that scattering and decays could be thought of as a perturbation. This allowed a bootstrap model with infinitely many particle types to be constructed like a field theory — the lowest order scattering amplitude should show Regge behavior and unitarity would determine the loop corrections order by order. This is how Gabriele Veneziano and many others, constructed string theory, which remains the only theory constructed from general consistency conditions and mild assumptions on the spectrum.

Many in the bootstrap community believed that field theory, which was plagued by problems of definition, was fundamentally inconsistent at high energies. Some believed that there is only one consistent theory which requires infinitely many particle species and whose form can be found by consistency alone. This is nowadays known not to be true, since there are many theories which are nonperturbatively consistent, each with their own S-matrix. Without the narrow-resonance approximation, the bootstrap program did not have a clear expansion parameter, and the consistency equations were often complicated and unwieldy, so that the method had limited success. It fell out of favor with the rise of quantum chromodynamics, which described mesons and baryons in terms of elementary particles called quarks and gluons. 

Bootstrapping here refers to 'pulling oneself up by one's bootstraps,' as particles were surmised to be held together by forces consisting of exchanges of the particles themselves.

In 2017 Quanta Magazine published an article in which bootstrap was said to enable new discoveries in the field of quantum theories. Decades after bootstrap seemed to be forgotten, physicists have discovered novel "bootstrap techniques" that appear to solve many problems. The bootstrap approach is said to be "a powerful tool for understanding more symmetric , perfect theories that, according to experts, serve as 'signposts' or 'building blocks' in the space of all possible quantum field theories".

See also
 Tullio Regge
 Stanley Mandelstam
 Conformal bootstrap

Notes

References 
 G. Chew (1962). S-Matrix theory of strong interactions. New York: W.A. Benjamin.
 D. Kaiser (2002). "Nuclear democracy: Political engagement, pedagogical reform, and particle physics in postwar America." Isis, 93, 229–268.

Further reading 
 

Scattering
Quantum field theory